Rashmi (also known as Duniya Rashmi) is an Indian actress in the Kannada film industry.

Career
Rashmi gained popularity as actress in 2007 Kannada film Duniya, and so called Duniya Rashmi.

Selected filmography
 Duniya (2007)
 Thangiya Mane (2007)
 Mandakini (2008)
 Akka Thangi (2008)
 Anu (2009)
 Mr. Theertha (2010)
 Ashakiranagalu (2012)
 Dabba film (2012)
 Flop Story (2013)
 Neerige Ba Chenni (2014)
 Adika Prasangi (2016)
 Hale Story Hosa Narration (2019)
 Michel and Marchony (2022)
 Premaya Namaha (2013)

Television
She was a participant in Bigg Boss Kannada (Season 7), a Kannada reality show which included a total of twenty contestants.

Awards

See also

List of people from Karnataka
Cinema of Karnataka
List of Indian film actresses
Cinema of India

References

External links

Actresses in Kannada cinema
Living people
Kannada people
Actresses from Karnataka
Indian film actresses
21st-century Indian actresses
Filmfare Awards South winners
Year of birth missing (living people)